Dagmar Sierck (14 March 1958 – 17 July 2015) was a German swimmer. She competed in the women's 100 metre breaststroke at the 1972 Summer Olympics.

References

External links
 

1958 births
2015 deaths
German female swimmers
Olympic swimmers of West Germany
Swimmers at the 1972 Summer Olympics
People from Uelzen (district)
German female breaststroke swimmers
Sportspeople from Lower Saxony